College Place is a town in Walla Walla County, Washington, United States. It neighbors the larger city of Walla Walla, and had a population of 9,902 at the 2020 census.

College Place is the home of Walla Walla University (formerly Walla Walla College, thus the city's name), a Seventh-day Adventist operated liberal arts university.
Due to the primarily Adventist population, most downtown College Place businesses close on Saturday, reopening in most cases on Sunday. College Avenue is the main street running north to south from Highway 12 to the Milton-Freewater Highway.

History
Martin Field, to the west of town, was an air training base during World War II. It is now a private airfield.

College Place was officially incorporated on January 19, 1946.

Geography
College Place is located at  (46.045127, -118.382425).

Climate
According to the Köppen Climate Classification system, College Place has a warm-summer Mediterranean climate, abbreviated "Csa" on climate maps.

Demographics

2010 census
At the 2010 census there were 8,765 people in 3,523 households, including 2,096 families, in the city. The racial makeup of the city was 85.7% White, 1.6% African American, 0.7% Native American, 1.9% Asian, 0.3% Pacific Islander, 6.8% from other races, and 3.1% from two or more races. Hispanic or Latino of any race were 18.5%.

Of the 3,523 households 24.9% had children under the age of 18 living with them, 44.4% were married couples living together, 11.0% had a female householder with no husband present, 4.1% had a male householder with no wife present, and 40.5% were non-families. 32.0% of households were one person and 13.2% were one person aged 65 or older. The average household size was 2.26 and the average family size was 2.85.

The median age was 32.8 years. 18.6% of residents were under the age of 18; 20.5% were between the ages of 18 and 24; 21.9% were from 25 to 44; 21% were from 45 to 64; and 18% were 65 or older. The gender makeup of the city was 48.1% male and 51.9% female.

2000 census
At the 2000 census, there were 7,818 people in 2,909 households, including 1,870 families, in the city. The population density was 3,232.2 people per square mile (1,247.3/km). There were 3,134 housing units at an average density of 1,295.7 per square mile (500.0/km). The racial makeup of the city was 86.83% White, 1.55% African American, 0.46% Native American, 1.75% Asian, 0.52% Pacific Islander, 6.28% from other races, and 2.61% from two or more races. Hispanic or Latino of any race were 12.74% of the population.

Of the 2,909 households 28.5% had children under the age of 18 living with them, 50.5% were married couples living together, 10.8% had a female householder with no husband present, and 35.7% were non-families. 29.4% of households were one person and 11.9% were one person aged 65 or older. The average household size was 2.36 and the average family size was 2.93.

The age distribution was 21.1% under the age of 18, 21.4% from 18 to 24, 23.2% from 25 to 44, 16.6% from 45 to 64, and 17.7% 65 or older. The median age was 31 years. For every 100 females, there were 91.6 males. For every 100 females age 18 and over, there were 87.8 males.

The median household income was $30,330 and the median family income  was $40,833. Males had a median income of $34,167 versus $25,871 for females. The per capita income for the city was $14,493. About 11.3% of families and 16.0% of the population were below the poverty line, including 17.8% of those under age 18 and 7.6% of those age 65 or over.

Notable people
 Dr. Charles E. Woodworth - ARS Researcher, Major

References

Cities in Washington (state)
Cities in Walla Walla County, Washington
1946 establishments in Washington (state)